Joseph "Joey" Quinn is a fictional character in the Showtime television series Dexter, portrayed by Desmond Harrington. Quinn is a cop who transferred to the Homicide division after being in narcotics before season three.

Appearances

Season three
Quinn first appears in the season opener, "Our Father", in which he is partnered with Debra Morgan (Jennifer Carpenter). He takes a liking to her, even helping her with a case by giving her one of his confidential informants. Quinn's past is unknown and even called into question, as Debra is pressured by Internal Affairs agent Yuki Amado (Liza Lapira) to report him. He eventually finds out about Amado from Debra, and he claims that her investigation of him is a "personal vendetta". Quinn has the Internal Affairs case dropped after Debra tells him about it. He later confesses to Debra that Amado was once his partner, and that she blames him for a colleague's death from a crystal methamphetamine overdose; Quinn knew about the man's addiction, but tried to offer private help instead of informing his superiors.

Season four
In season four, Quinn bears a grudge against Dexter Morgan (Michael C. Hall) for botching the blood work for a case he worked on. However, after Dexter sees Quinn taking money from a crime scene, he tries to shut him up by buying him expensive football tickets. Meanwhile, Quinn starts a relationship with Christine Hill (Courtney Ford), a reporter who flirtatiously grills him for information on his cases. After a confidential police lead ends up in one of Hill's articles, Lt. María LaGuerta (Lauren Vélez) warns Quinn to be wary of any reporter who squeezes him for confidential information over pillow talk. Nonetheless, Quinn tells Hill about numerous police reports (supposedly "off the record"), and she uses this information to report that FBI agent Frank Lundy (Keith Carradine) has returned to Miami. Quinn breaks up with Hill after she publishes the article about Lundy, but the two soon get back together. Though more careful about what he says around her, Quinn still defends Hill when Dexter tells her to leave Debra alone, as Hill wanted to do a piece on her about a shooting, she was involved in. Quinn denounces Hill after it is revealed that she is the Trinity Killer's daughter and had been manipulating him to keep her father from being arrested. After Hill commits suicide, however, he is clearly distraught.

Season five
In season five, Quinn comes to suspect that Dexter murdered his wife Rita Bennett (Julie Benz) after learning that Rita shared a kiss with a neighbor, mixed with subtle differences in the modus operandi of the supposed killer, Arthur Mitchell (John Lithgow). Following the fact that Dexter was part of the raid during Rita's time of death, he begins to focus on the composite sketches of "Kyle Butler" and determines it to be Dexter. After tracking down Mitchell's son Jonah (Brando Eaton), who was due to enter witness protection, he attempts to have him identify Dexter as Butler, but is caught by marshals and suspended.

Unable to continue, Quinn hires private investigator Stan Liddy (Peter Weller) to investigate Dexter. After a one-night stand with Debra, Quinn repeatedly tries to get her back into bed, eventually succeeding. The two begin to date, until Debra discovers that Quinn was suspended by LaGuerta for investigating Dexter. In order to show her that his feelings for her are real, Quinn tells Liddy to drop his investigation of Dexter.  Liddy delivers to Quinn pictures of Dexter and Lumen Pierce (Julia Stiles) disposing of a body. When Liddy is murdered, Quinn becomes a suspect because of the five phone calls Liddy placed to him directly prior to his death, as well as the blood on Quinn's boot. Dexter, who killed Liddy to protect himself and Lumen, fakes the blood report so Quinn will be eliminated as a suspect. Quinn goes to Dexter's son Harrison's birthday party with Debra, and thanks Dexter for his help.

Season six
At the start of season six, Quinn and Debra have been living together for a few months. Quinn proposes to Debra, but she turns him down because she wants their relationship to stay as it is. As a result, they break up. With Debra's concurrent promotion to Lieutenant, Quinn begins to resent her, believing she values her work more than she does him.  He begins drinking heavily and having random one-night stands, once turning up to Debra's housewarming with a girl he flippantly refers to as "chick from bar", and hitting on Batista's sister Jamie (Aimee Garcia).  His womanizing also affects his work when he endangers the investigation of suspected "Doomsday Killer" Professor Gellar (Edward James Olmos) by sleeping with his assistant, an important material witness. Debra calls him into her office to tell him they can never be together. Quinn accepts her decision, albeit regretfully.

Season seven
When Miami Metro detective Mike Anderson (Billy Brown) is murdered by members of a Russian organized crime syndicate, Quinn goes with his new partner Angel Batista (David Zayas) to question the owners of one of the syndicate's strip clubs. He develops a relationship with Nadia (Katia Winter), one of the club's dancers. The club's owner, George Novikov (Jason Gedrick), offers to give Nadia a passport and her freedom if Quinn disposes of blood evidence linking the head of the syndicate, Isaak Sirko (Ray Stevenson), to three murders; if he does not comply, Novikov will send her to a sex club in Dubai. Quinn reluctantly disposes of the evidence and takes a bribe. Novikov does not keep his end of the bargain, however, and threatens to expose Quinn unless he goes on the syndicate's payroll. Soon afterward, Nadia tells Quinn that Novikov forced her to have sex with him. Enraged, Quinn beats Novikov up and kills him in cold blood after he hits Nadia. He stages the scene to look like he had acted in self-defense. Nadia gets her passport, but tells Quinn she has to move on. Quinn then gives the dirty money to Batista so he can open a restaurant.

Season eight
At the beginning of season eight, Quinn is in a relationship with Jamie Batista. However, he still has feelings for Debra, who had quit Miami Metro six months earlier to work as a private detective. In "What's Eating Dexter Morgan?" Debra is arrested for drunk driving, and calls him to bail her out, which arouses Jamie's suspicion and jealousy. When he punches a fellow detective for insulting Debra, Jamie asks him point-blank if he is still in love with Debra; Quinn says no. Later, Debra shows up at Miami Metro, blind drunk, and confesses to killing LaGuerta. Unaware that she is telling the truth, he calls Dexter and tells him that she is not in her right mind, and allows him to take her away. Later, she meets with him to apologize for her behavior, and wishes him happiness with Jamie.

Jamie asks Quinn to move in with her, which he does with some apprehension. In order to prove to her and her brother that he is taking his career seriously, he takes the sergeant's exam. He does well, but Batista ultimately chooses another candidate. Frustrated, Quinn tries to prove himself by investigating murder suspect — and Dexter's new " protege" — Zach Hamilton (Sam Underwood). The investigation puts him back in contact with Debra, and they share a kiss. Days later, he ends his relationship with Jamie, but denies that it has anything to do with Debra. When Debra returns to Miami Metro, however, they acknowledge their feelings for each other and renew their relationship.

In the series' final episode, "Remember the Monsters?", Debra is shot by serial killer Oliver Saxon (Darri Ingolfson). Quinn rides with her to the hospital, where she tells him she loves him. Soon afterward, however, she has a stroke that leaves her in a persistent vegetative state. Overcome with grief and rage, he attacks Saxon in Miami Metro's interrogation room. After Dexter kills Saxon in full view of a security camera, Quinn and Batista bring him in for questioning. Dexter claims self-defense, which they both appear to accept. Quinn says that he wishes he could have killed Saxon personally; it is suggested that he knows that Dexter murdered Saxon, but considers his actions justified.

Relationships
Quinn is known to have had very bad relationships with several women. In Season 4, Quinn dates the Trinity Killer's daughter, Christine Hill. However, this relationship ends when Christine is charged with murder for killing Frank Lundy to save her dad. He starts to have a relationship with Debra, and even proposes, but she breaks up with him because she does not want their relationship to change. He numbs the pain of that rejection with a series of one-night-stands, but by season eight is in a relationship with Jamie Batista. He ends this relationship to be with Debra, only to lose her shortly afterwards.

External links
 Joey Quinn on IMDb

Dexter (series) characters
Fictional Miami-Dade Police Department detectives
Fictional murderers
Police misconduct in fiction
Television characters introduced in 2008
Male characters in television